Pseudodellamora is a genus of beetles in the family Mordellidae, containing the following species:

 Pseudodellamora brevicollis (Emery, 1876)
 Pseudodellamora championi (Schilsky, 1899)
 Pseudodellamora distinguenda Ermisch, 1963
 Pseudodellamora grossepalpalis Ermisch, 1942

References

Mordellidae